XEHN-AM/XHHN-FM is a radio station on 1130 AM and 89.9 FM in Nogales, Sonora. It is owned by Grupo Radiorama and carries a pop format known as Arroba FM.

History
Javier Manzanera Contreras received the concession for XEHN on November 29, 1972. It was later sold in 1982, became a Radiorama affiliate and was spun off to Larsa.

Radiovisa took over XHHN and XHCG-FM upon the signing on of the FM frequencies in November 2018, instituting new formats.

On July 7, 2019, ISA Medios, an outdoor advertising company which had the previous month entered broadcasting in Ciudad Obregón, by assuming operations of XHCG and XHHN-FM 89.5. XHHN became the Los 40 station for Nogales.

This station reverted to Radiorama control, until January 1, 2022

References

Radio stations in Sonora
Radio stations established in 1972